HMS Warspite was a 74-gun third rate ship of the line (a new class of two-decker that formed the backbone of British fleets) of the Royal Navy, launched on 8 April 1758 at Deptford.

Her first service in the Seven Years' War against France was as one of Admiral Edward Boscawen's 14 ships in the Mediterranean, and on 19 August 1759 she took part in the Battle of Lagos, where she captured the French Téméraire. Warspite also participated in the Battle of Quiberon Bay under Admiral Sir Edward Hawke.

After the signing of the Treaty of Paris she was paid off on 5 May 1763, reappearing as a hospital ship during the American Revolutionary War (1775–83).

She was employed on harbour service from 1778. She was renamed Arundel in March 1800, and was eventually broken up at Portsmouth Dockyard in November 1801.

Notes

References

 

Ships of the line of the Royal Navy
Dublin-class ships of the line
1758 ships